Russel J. Reiter (born 1936) is an American researcher and Professor of Cell Systems and Anatomy  at the University of Texas Health Science Center.
He is one of the top highly cited researchers (h>100) according to webometrics.

References 

1936 births
Living people
University of Texas Health Science Center at San Antonio faculty
American anatomists